SEHS may refer to:

St. Edmond High School (Fort Dodge, Iowa), United States
St. Edmund High School (Eunice, Louisiana), United States
St. Edward High School (Lakewood, Ohio), United States
St. Edward's High School, Austin, Texas, United States
St. Elizabeth High School (Oakland, California), United States
St. Elizabeth High School (Wilmington, Delaware), United States
Sachem East High School, Farmingville, New York, United States
Salisbury East High School, Salisbury East, South Australia, Australia
Seneca East High School, Attica, Ohio, United States
Sherburne-Earlville High School, part of the Sherburne-Earlville Central School, Sherburne, New York, United States
South-Eastern High speed
Rout on TSW2 and in irl. Runs from Stratford International to Faversham. 
South Effingham High School, Guyton, Georgia, United States
South Elgin High School, South Elgin, Illinois, United States
South End Historical Society, Boston, Massachusetts, United States
South Eugene High School, Eugene, Oregon, United States
Southeast Guilford High School, Greensboro, North Carolina, United States
Stanhope Elmore High School, Millbrook, Alabama
Southeast High School, Wichita, Kansas